was a Japanese politician.

Early life
Born in Noshiro, Akita, Ishida entered Waseda University, where he majored in political science and economics. After graduating in 1939, he joined Chugai Shōgyō Shimpo (later renamed Nihon Keizai Shimbun) and was appointed as its chief correspondent in Shanghai.

Political career
In 1947, Ishida was elected to the House of Representatives. He joined the Liberal Democratic Party (LDP) in 1955, serving as Chief Cabinet Secretary under two prime ministers, Tanzan Ishibashi and Nobusuke Kishi, from 23 December 1956 to 10 July 1957. Widely viewed as a friend and proponent of labor unions (an unusual stance in the pro-business LDP), he was also appointed to five terms as minister of labor  under four different prime ministers, in addition to one term as minister of transport. While minister of labor under Prime Minister Hayato Ikeda in 1960, Ishida successfully negotiated the end of the 1960 Miike Coal Mine Strike, which remains the  largest labor-management dispute in Japanese history.

In January 1963, Ishida published an article in Chūō Kōron predicting that the Liberal Democratic Party would lose power to the Japan Socialist Party by 1970 due to ongoing changes in Japanese society, including urbanization, increasing education, and the decreasing number of farmers, who were generally seen as fundamental supporters of the LDP. Ishida's article shocked the LDP, but was hailed as perceptive, and stimulated the party to make a number of reforms, including to changing its policies to increase its appeal among urban workers.

Ishida formed and chaired the Japan-USSR Friendship Parliamentarians' Union in 1973, visiting Moscow in 1973, 1974 and 1977. Stanislav Levchenko, a KGB Major who defected to the United States in 1979, revealed that Ishida was an agent for the Soviet Union.

Ishida left politics in November 1983.

Ishida Rose Garden

An amateur rosarian, Ishida planted the yard of his house with various kind of roses. Two years after his death, his rose garden was donated to the City of Odate and named . It is since opened to the public every June.

Honours
Grand Cordon of the Order of the Rising Sun (1987)

References

External links

|-

|-

|-

|-

|-

Labor ministers of Japan
Recipients of the Order of the Rising Sun
Japanese spies for the Soviet Union
People from Noshiro, Akita
Waseda University alumni
1914 births
1993 deaths
Liberal Democratic Party (Japan) politicians
Members of the House of Representatives (Japan)
Politicians from Akita Prefecture
Ministers of Land, Infrastructure, Transport and Tourism of Japan